Jaime Enrique Villegas Roura (born 5 July 1950 in La Ceiba) is a Honduran football defender who played for Honduras in the 1982 FIFA World Cup.

Club career
He also played for Real España. He played a then record 309 matches in the Honduran National League

International career
Villegas played several years for Honduras and has earned over 30 caps. He has represented his country in 25 FIFA World Cup qualification matches and played at the 1982 FIFA World Cup.

Club President
In May 2010, Villegas confirmed he would be Real España's new president and later became sporting director.

Honours and awards

Club
C.D. Real Espana
Liga Profesional de Honduras (4):  1974–75, 1975–76, 1976–77, 1980–81
Honduran Cup (1): 1972,
Copa Interclubes UNCAF (1): 1982

References

External links
FIFA profile

1950 births
Living people
Association football defenders
Honduran footballers
Honduras international footballers
1982 FIFA World Cup players
Real C.D. España players
Liga Nacional de Fútbol Profesional de Honduras players
CONCACAF Championship-winning players